The 1921 Southern Intercollegiate Athletic Association football season was the college football games played by the member schools of the Southern Intercollegiate Athletic Association as part of the 1921 college football season.

The season began on September 23 with conference member Chattanooga visiting Athens. Conference play began on September 24 with Alabama defeating Howard.

Centre, Georgia Tech, Georgia, and Vanderbilt can all claim Southern championships. Centre and Georgia Tech both posted unblemished conference records. Georgia and Vanderbilt tied each other in their contest deciding a champion.

This is the last year before many major programs move to the Southern Conference.

Regular season

SIAA teams in bold.

Week One

Week Two

Week Three

Week Four

Week Five

Week Six

Week Seven

Week Eight

Week Nine

Week Ten

Week Eleven

Bowl games

Awards and honors

All-Americans

E – Red Roberts, Centre (WC-1; FW-2 [g]; JV-3; MM-2)
E – Owen Reynolds, Georgia (FW-3)
G – Puss Whelchel, Georgia (WC-3)
QB – Bo McMillin, Centre (FW-1; WC-2; LP-1 [hb]; BE-2; JV-2; MM-1; NB-1)
HB – Red Barron, Georgia Tech (JV-3)
FB – Judy Harlan, Georgia Tech (WC-3; FW-3)

All-Southern team

The following includes the composite All-Southern  eleven awarded gold badges and formed by 30 sports writers culled by the Atlanta Constitution and Atlanta Journal.

See also
1921 Centre vs. Harvard football game

References